The Commission on the Filipino Language (CFL), also referred to as the Komisyon sa Wikang Filipino (KWF), is the official regulating body of the Filipino language and the official government institution tasked with developing, preserving, and promoting the various local Philippine languages. The commission was established in accordance with the 1987 Constitution of the Philippines.

Established by Republic Act No. 7104 in 1991, the commission is a replacement for the Institute of Philippine Languages (IPL; Linangan ng mga Wika sa Pilipinas) that was set up in 1987 which was a replacement of the older Institute of National Language (INL; Surian ng Wikang Pambansa), established in 1937 as the first government agency to foster the development of a Philippine national language.

History 
The 1st National Assembly of the Philippines passed Commonwealth Act No. 184 of 1936, establishing the Institute of National Language (Surian ng Wikang Pambansa). On January 12, 1937, President Manuel L. Quezon appointed the members to compose the INL. By virtue of Executive Order No. 134 issued and signed by President Quezon on December 30, 1937, approved the adoption of Tagalog as the basis of the national language, and declared and proclaimed the national language based on Tagalog, as the national language of the Philippines. In 1938, the INL was dissolved and replaced with the National Language Institute. Its purpose was to prepare for the nationwide teaching of the Tagalog-based national language (Wikang Pambansa na batay/base sa Tagalog) by creating a dictionary and a grammar book with a standardized orthography. In the school year of 1940–1941, the teaching of the national language (wikang pambansa), with its new standardized orthography, was set by law in the fourth year of all high schools in both public and private schools throughout the country. The Tagalog-based national language was taught in school only as one of the subject areas in 1940, but was not adapted as the medium of instruction.

During World War II, the Japanese occupiers encouraged the use of the national language rather than English in schools. The Tagalog-based national language was, therefore, propagated not only in education but also in mass media and in official communication. The census for 1948 reported that 7,126,913 people or 37.11% of the population spoke the language, representing an increase of 11.7% from the 1939 figure of 4,068,565. Of these seven million people, 47.7% learnt it as a second language.

The current commission was established by Republic Act No. 7104 of 1991, replacing the Institute of Philippine Languages (IPL) that was previously set up in January 1987 (Executive Order No. 117); itself, a replacement of the older Institute of National Language (INL), established in 1937.

In October 2018, the KWF announced in its newsletter Diyaryo Filipino (Filipino Newspaper) its bringing online a National Dictionary in compliance with the commission's Ortograpiyang Pambansa (National Orthography) of 2013. According to the same October 2018 newsletter, also in the works (in experimental and pilot-testing stage) is an official spellcheck in accordance with the Ortograpiyang Pambansa (National Orthography) and the Manwal sa Masinop na Pagsulat (Manual to Provident/Neat/Careful Writing).

Original commission members (circa 1937)
Jaime C. de Veyra (Waray-Waray Visayan), Chairman
Santiago A. Fonacier (Ilocano), Member
Casimiro F. Perfecto (Bicolano), Member
Felix S. Salas Rodriguez (Hiligaynon Visayan), Member
Filemon Sotto (Cebuano Visayan), Member
Cecilio López (Tagalog), Member and Secretary
Hadji Butu (Moro), Member

Board of Commissioners (present)

Arthur P. Casanova (Chairman of the Commission/Tagapangulo)
Jimmy B. Fong (Mga Wika sa Kahilagaang Pamayanang Kultural/Languages of Northern Cultural Communities)
Alain Dimzon (Hiligaynon)
Hope Yu (Cebuano)
Resigned (Pangasinan)
Resigned (Kapampangan)
Benjamin Mendillo Jr., PhD (Ilocano)
Angela Lorenzana. (Bicolano)
Carmelita C. Abdurahman (Waray)
Abe Sakili (Mga Wika sa Muslim Mindanao/ Languages of Muslim Mindanao)
Benjamin Mendillo Jr., PhD (OIC-Director General of the Commission)

Language diversity
The Philippines is one of the most linguistically diverse countries in the world. With 175 distinct native languages (sometimes incorrectly termed dialects), it has about 3% of the world’s languages, yet only 0.2% of Earth’s land area, making the Philippines 15 times more diverse than average in terms of language diversity.

Ethnologue, a compendium of world languages, notes that 28 Philippine languages are in trouble, up from 13 in 2016. Eleven languages are dying, and several are already extinct. The Living Tongues Institute for Endangered Languages has identified the Philippines as being one of the top 10 “language hotspots” of the world, which means that the Philippines has a wealth of languages but such languages are being lost at a rate faster than those languages can be documented properly.

Ethnologue’s estimates are conservative, as many linguists have noted that many endangered languages in the Philippines. All 32 Negrito languages of the Philippines are endangered (Headland, 2003), and the Komisyon sa Wikang Filipino has identified approximately 50 endangered languages.

Endangered Filipino Languages List
A 2015 study by the Commission updated the list of endangered languages in the Philippines. The Commission noted that there are 37 languages in the country that are now endangered, mostly Aeta languages in Luzon and Visayas, notably Negros Occidental. The Kinarol-an language Barangay Carol-an, Kabankalan, Negros Occidental was considered as extinct as it was no longer being used in casual conversations. The study also noted that the Inagtâ Isaróg language of Goa, Ocampo and Tigaon in Camarines Sur had only one remaining speaker in 2015.

The Árta language of Nagtipunan, Quirino is considered nearly extinct as only 11 persons are speaking the language. Languages that are moribund (near extinction) include: the Inatá language of Cadiz City, Negros Occidental; Álta language of Aurora, Nueva Ecija; and Ayta Magbukun language of Abucay, Bataan. The Ayta Magbukun has at least 114 practicing families, while the others range from only 29 to 113 persons.

Meanwhile, the threatened languages with more than a thousand speakers remaining are Álta Kabulowán of Gabaldon, Nueva Ecija; Ayta Mag-Indí of Pampanga and Zambales; and Gubatnón Mangyán of Magsaysay, Occidental Mindoro.

Those that have lessening usage include Inagta Irayá of Buhi, Camarines Sur; Binaták of Palawan; Manidé of Camarines Norte; Ayta Kadí of Quezon Province; Ayta Ambalá of Zambales and Bataan; Ayta Mag-antsi of Tarlac, Nueva Ecija, and Zambales; Ténap (Agta Dupaningan) of Cagayan and Isabela; Bolinaw of Pangasinan; Agta Dumagat Casiguran of Isabela and Aurora; and Agtâ Dumagat Umíray of Quezon Province.

Part also of the list are languages which the KWF consider as under threat and needing further studies. These are Manobo Kalamansíg of Sultan Kudarat; Ratagnón Mangyán of Occidental Mindoro; Îguwák of Nueva Vizcaya; Karáw of Benguet; Tagabulos of Aurora, Bulacan, and Quezon Province; Bangon Mangyán of Oriental Mindoro; Manobo Ilyanen of Cotabato; Gâdang of Mountain Province; Kalamyanën of Palawan; Tadyawan Mangyán of Oriental Mindoro; Finallíg of Barlig, Mountain Province; Menuvú of Bukidnon; Tawbuwíd Mangyán of Occidental and Oriental Mindoro; Manóbo Arománën of Cotabato; Manóbo Tigwahánon of Bukidnon; and Abéllen of Tarlac. Also listed under threat is the Irungdungan (Agta Isirigan) of Cagayan but the KWF observes a rising number of speakers.

The Commission, with the much-needed cooperation and initiated of provincial and local governments, embarked on a landmark project on language revitalization in Abucay, Bataan in 2018, helping the Ayta Magbukun communities in the town’s village of Bangkal through Bahay Wika where young members of the ethnic group are being taught of their language by two elders.

Criticism
One major criticism of the commission is that it supposedly fails in its goal of further developing the Filipino language. This is grounded in the fact that Filipino is essentially Tagalog, a fact acknowledged by former Commissioner, Ricardo María Durán Nolasco, and with an impoverished technical and scientific vocabulary, at that, which relies heavily on foreign borrowings and, often, constructions. It is often left to the universities to develop their own respective terminologies for each field, leading to a lack of uniformity and general public disuse.

It is argued that current state of the Filipino language is contrary to the intention of Republic Act (RA) No. 7104 that requires that the national language be developed and enriched by the lexicon of the country's other languages. However, Resolution 92-1, which defines the national language as "the language spoken in Metro Manila and other business centers of the country", does not necessarily run counter to RA No. 7104.

See also
Language policy
Philippine languages
Filipino alphabet
Filipino orthography
Sentro ng Wikang Filipino
Visayan Academy of Arts and Letters
Defunct language regulators
Academia Bicolana
Sanghiran san Binisaya

Notes

References

External links

Republic Act No. 7104, Chan Robles Law Library
The Language Planning Situation in the Philippines, by Andrew Gonzalez, FSC

Language regulators
Filipino language
Government agencies under the Office of the President of the Philippines
1937 establishments in the Philippines
1991 establishments in the Philippines